Dallas Ferguson (born November 24, 1972) is a Canadian former professional ice hockey defenceman and coach.  Ferguson retired as a player in 2000 following a four-year professional career in the West Coast Hockey League with the Alaska Gold Kings and Anchorage Aces.

In 2008, Ferguson became the 25th head coach of the Alaska Nanooks, taking over from Doc DeCastillo. He coached the 2009–10 Nanooks to the NCAA Tournament for the first time in program history. In 2014, due to a lack of institutional compliance, all wins and ties from 2007–08 through 2011–12 were forfeited and the program's lone NCAA appearance was vacated.

He was the head coach for the Calgary Hitmen of the Western Hockey League in the 2017–18 season.

He returned to college hockey as an assistant with the University of Denver Pioneers in 2018.

Head coaching record

†Alaska was retroactively forced to forfeit all wins and ties due to player ineligibilities.

References

External links
 Official biography, Denver Pioneers

1972 births
Alaska Nanooks men's ice hockey coaches
Alaska Nanooks men's ice hockey players
Anchorage Aces players
Calgary Hitmen coaches
Canadian ice hockey coaches
Canadian ice hockey defencemen
Ice hockey people from Alberta
Living people
People from the Municipal District of Wainwright No. 61
Richmond Renegades players